This was the first known bronze hoard discovered in the Gangetic valley and consists of a set of 18 Jain bronzes.
The Chausa hoard, thus named after the place of discovery: Chausa or Chausagarh is located in the Buxar district of Bihar state, India.

History 
This was the first known bronze hoard discovered in the Gangetic valley and consists of a set of 18 Jain bronzes. The oldest of such bronzes to be found in India, experts date them between the Shunga and the Gupta period, (from 2nd, or possibly the 1st century BC, to the 6th Century AD).

Patrick Krueger in his classification of Jain bronzes, regards them to be early type, characterized by portrayal of a single Tirthankara without a parikara.

Major Idols 
The hoard includes a Dharmachakra showing Dharmachakra supported by two yakshis supported by makaras; a kalpavriksha and sixteen tirthankaras. Among the tirthankaras, those of Rishabha are easily identified by the locks of hair. The bronzes currently reside in the Patna museum.

Other well-known hoards of Jain bronzes include Akota Bronzes, found in Gujarat; Vasantgarh hoard, found in Vasantgarh; Hansi hoard, found in Haryana; and Aluara bronzes, found in Bihar.

See also

 Jainism
 Tirthankara
 Jain Sculpture
 Indian art

Notes

References
 Huntington, Susan; The art of Ancient India: Buddhist, Hindu, Jain
 
 Buddhapada

Treasure troves of India
Jain sculptures
Sculptures from Bihar